Sir Charles-Eugène-Napoléon Boucher de Boucherville  (May 4, 1822 – September 10, 1915) was a Canadian politician and doctor. He twice served as the premier of Quebec.

Personal life
Boucher was born in Montreal, Quebec, Canada. Descended from Pierre Boucher, he was one of the three children of Pierre Boucher de Boucherville (1780–1857), Seigneur of Boucherville, and Marguerite-Émilie de Bleury (1786–1812), sister of Clément-Charles Sabrevois de Bleury. Boucher de Boucherville took his MD from McGill University, graduating with an MD in 1843.

Political career

During the Chauveau administration, he served as Speaker of the Legislative Council. He became premier in 1874 when his predecessor, Gédéon Ouimet, had to resign due to a financial scandal.  He then won the 1875 Quebec election but was removed from office on March 8, 1878, in a conflict with Lieutenant Governor Luc Letellier de Saint-Just. Letellier de Saint-Just refused to approve legislation that had been passed by both houses of the Quebec legislature that would have forced municipalities to pay for railway construction. The Lieutenant-Governor deposed Boucher de Boucherville, and called on the Leader of the Opposition, Henri-Gustave Joly de Lotbinière, to form a government.

Boucher de Boucherville's second term came about after Honoré Mercier was removed from office by Lieutenant Governor Auguste-Réal Angers on December 16, 1891, on charges of corruption.  Mercier was later cleared.

After Conservative leader Louis-Olivier Taillon had lost the 1890 election and his own seat, Jean Blanchet had taken over as Leader of the Opposition to the Mercier government. Blanchet, however, had resigned on September 19, 1891, to accept an appointment as a judge.  The Lieutenant Governor, therefore, needed a Conservative to fill the post of Premier and turned to Boucher de Boucherville.

Boucher de Boucherville served for one year but resigned when former Conservative premier Joseph-Adolphe Chapleau was appointed Lieutenant-Governor in December 1892.  Relations between the two may have been strained. By 1915 the oldest legislator in North America, he died that year in Montreal at the Deaf and Dumb Institute, in whose work he was so interested that he lived there.

See also
Politics of Quebec
List of Quebec general elections
Timeline of Quebec history

External links and references
 
 
 
 

1822 births
1915 deaths
Canadian senators from Quebec
Canadian Knights Commander of the Order of St Michael and St George
Conservative Party of Canada (1867–1942) senators
Premiers of Quebec
McGill University Faculty of Medicine alumni
19th-century Canadian physicians
Quebec political party leaders
Presidents of the Legislative Council of Quebec
Conservative Party of Quebec MLCs
Members of the Legislative Assembly of the Province of Canada from Canada East